Eat Out to Help Out was a British government scheme to support and create jobs in the hospitality industry to counter the economic impacts of the COVID-19 pandemic. The scheme involved the government subsidising food and non-alcoholic drinks at participating cafes, pubs, and restaurants at 50%, up to £10 per person (per order). The offer, announced in July 2020, was available during the month of August 2020, from Monday to Wednesday each week.

In total, the scheme subsidised £849 million across 160 million subsidised meals. Some consider the scheme to be a success in boosting the hospitality industry, while others disagree. A 2021 study found that the scheme contributed to a rise in COVID-19 infections.

Background 

The COVID-19 pandemic resulted in a significant economic impacts, especially in the hospitality sector, due to a decline in tourism and leisure activities. Many sectors were ordered to close and the public to stay at home to reduce the spread of COVID-19 during lockdowns. Changes in consumer behaviour during the pandemic also resulted in the hospitality sector continuing to suffer losses after lockdowns were lifted. The Eat Out to Help Out scheme was designed to increase demand in the hospitality industry and encourage spending consumer behaviours.

Scheme and impact 
The scheme was announced by Rishi Sunak, the Chancellor of the Exchequer, on 8 July 2020 as part of the British government's Plan for Jobs strategy. It involved the government subsidising food and non-alcoholic drinks at participating cafes, pubs, and restaurants, where the food and drinks were consumed on the premises. The subsidy was for 50% of the order, up to £10 per person (per order). The offer was available from 3 to 31 August, from Monday to Wednesday each week. There were no limits on how many times an individual could use the discount.

The scheme led to a significant increase in restaurant visits during August, which were greater than the visits during the corresponding period a year prior (in August 2019). Participation in recreational activities was also increased by 5–6% on the days the scheme was active. Staff recruitment in the food service industry–measured by job postings–had increased by 7% to 14%, an increase not detected in other industries.

Regions where the scheme was utilised more frequently saw a rise in COVID-19 infections. After the scheme ended, infections in these regions had notably decreased. A 2021 academic paper suggested the scheme may have been responsible for between 8–17% of new COVID-19 cases during the late summer. Two papers suggested that positive economic impacts were not sustained after the scheme had ended. 

Further lockdowns were introduced later in 2020 after the scheme ended in response to an increase in COVID-19 infections, which forced many hospitality venues to close once again.

On The Andrew Marr Show on 4 October 2020, Johnson acknowledged the possibility that "Eat Out to Help Out" could have helped spread COVID-19, saying:I also think that it is important now, irrespective of whether Eat Out To Help Out you know, what the balance of there was, it unquestionably helped to protect many… there are two million jobs at least in the hospitality sector. It was very important to keep those jobs going. Now, if it, insofar as that scheme may have helped to spread the virus, then obviously we need to counteract that and we need to counteract that with the discipline and the measures that we’re proposing. I hope you understand the balance we’re trying to strike.

See also 

 British government response to the COVID-19 pandemic

References

Sources

External links 
 A Plan for Jobs 2020: Policy paper

2020 in British politics
COVID-19 pandemic in the United Kingdom
United Kingdom responses to the COVID-19 pandemic
Hospitality industry in the United Kingdom
Economic history of the United Kingdom
Subsidies
Rishi Sunak